HMS Ringarooma was a  cruiser of the Royal Navy, originally named HMS Psyche, built by J & G Thomson, Glasgow and launched on 10 December 1889. Renamed on 2 April 1890, as Ringarooma as part of the Auxiliary Squadron of the Australia Station. She arrived in Sydney with the squadron on 5 September 1891. She was damaged after running aground on a reef at Makelula Island, New Hebrides on 31 August 1894 and was pulled off by the French cruiser Duchaffault. Between 1897 and 1900 she was in reserve at Sydney. On 15 February Captain Frederick St. George Rich was appointed in command. She left the Australia Station on 22 August 1904. She was sold for £8500 in May 1906 to Forth Shipbreaking Company for breaking up.

Notes

References
Bastock, John (1988), Ships on the Australia Station, Child & Associates Publishing Pty Ltd; Frenchs Forest, Australia.

External links

 

1889 ships
Ships built on the River Clyde
Pearl-class cruisers
Victorian-era cruisers of the United Kingdom